Lalsalu (titled A Tree Without Roots internationally) is a 2001 Bangladeshi film directed and produced by Tanvir Mokammel. The screenplay is based on Syed Waliullah's 1948 novel of the same name.

The film earned eight Bangladesh National Film Awards, including Best Film and Best Director for Tanvir Mokammel.

Cast
 Tauquir Ahmed as Akkas Miah
 Raisul Islam Asad as Majid
 Mehbooba Mahnoor Chandni as Jamila
 Munira Yusuf Memy as Rahima
 Amirul Haque Chowdhury as Khalek Bepari
 Aly Zaker
 Chitralekha Guho
 Rawshan Jamil

Awards

Bangladesh National Film Awards
 Best Film
 Best Director
 Best Actor
 Best Story
 Best Dialogue
 Best Cinematography
 Best Sound Recording

BACHSAS Awards
 Critics' Award for Best Actor

References

Further reading

External links
 

2001 films
Bengali-language Bangladeshi films
2000s Bengali-language films
Films directed by Tanvir Mokammel
Best Film National Film Award (Bangladesh) winners